Kellogg Kennon Venable Casey (September 17, 1877 – October 18, 1938) was an American sport shooter, who competed in the 1908 Summer Olympics.

In the 1908 Olympics he won a gold medal in the team military rifle event and a silver medal in the 1000 yard free rifle event.

References

External links
profile

1877 births
1938 deaths
American male sport shooters
United States Distinguished Marksman
ISSF rifle shooters
Shooters at the 1908 Summer Olympics
Olympic gold medalists for the United States in shooting
Olympic silver medalists for the United States in shooting
Medalists at the 1908 Summer Olympics
Sportspeople from New York City
19th-century American people
20th-century American people